Guy Duraffourg (born 15 December 1936) is a French biathlete. He competed in the 20 km individual event at the 1968 Winter Olympics.

References

1936 births
Living people
French male biathletes
Olympic biathletes of France
Biathletes at the 1968 Winter Olympics
Sportspeople from Jura (department)